Walter Palmore (born August 9, 1996) is an American football defensive tackle for the Michigan Panthers of the United States Football League (USFL). He played college football at the University of Missouri.

Early years 
Palmore attended Hardaway High School. He played only one season of football as a senior. He enrolled at Coffeyville Community College, where he was redshirted in 2014. 

He transferred to Eastern Arizona Junior College in 2015. As a freshman, he tallied 36 tackles and five quarterback sacks. As a sophomore, he made 35 tackles (1.5 for loss), three quarterback sacks and one forced fumble. 

As a junior, he transferred to the University of Missouri. He appeared in 10 games and registered 13 tackles. He had 6 tackles in the season opener against the Missouri State University. He made 4 tackles (one for loss) and two quarterback pressures against the University of Tennessee. 

As a senior, he started all 13 games, posting 31 tackles (ninth on the team), four tackles for loss, one sack, two quarterback pressures, two pass break ups and one blocked kick. He had three tackles against Oklahoma State University in the 2018 Liberty Bowl.

Professional career

Houston Texans
Palmore was signed as an undrafted free agent by the Houston Texans after the 2019 NFL Draft on May 10. On July 21, he was placed on the active/non-football injury list. On July 31, he was moved to the active roster after passing his physical. He was waived during final roster cuts on August 31.

Houston Roughnecks
In 2020, he was selected by the Houston Roughnecks in the Phase #5 portion of the 2020 XFL Draft. He appeared in two games, registering six tackles (one for loss), 0.5 sacks and one quarterback pressure. In March, amid the COVID-19 pandemic, the league announced that it would be cancelling the rest of the season. In April, the XFL suspended operations and filed for bankruptcy, and he had his contract terminated on April 10.

Dallas Cowboys
On October 21, 2020, he was signed as a free agent by the Dallas Cowboys to their practice squad. On November 13, he was placed on the practice squad/COVID-19 list, and restored to the practice squad on December 2. He was elevated to the active roster on January 2, 2021, for the team's week 17 game against the New York Giants, and reverted to the practice squad after the game. On January 4, he signed a reserve/future contract with the Cowboys. On May 5, 2021, he was waived after the Cowboys used eight of their 11 selections in the 2021 NFL Draft on defensive players.

Seattle Seahawks
On May 13, 2021, Palmore signed with the Seattle Seahawks. He was waived on August 16, 2021.

Carolina Panthers
On August 18, 2021, Palmore signed with the Carolina Panthers. He was waived on August 23.

Michigan Panthers
On April 1, 2022, Palmore signed with the Michigan Panthers of the United States Football League (USFL). He appeared in 9 games and made 17 tackles. On June 17, 2022, he was transferred to the inactive roster.

References

External links
Missouri Tigers bio

1996 births
Living people
Players of American football from Columbus, Georgia
American football defensive tackles
Coffeyville Red Ravens football players
Eastern Arizona Gila Monsters football players
Missouri Tigers football players
Houston Roughnecks players
Dallas Cowboys players
Seattle Seahawks players
Carolina Panthers players
Michigan Panthers (2022) players